Robert Lupu (born 28 October 1982), is a Romanian futsal player who plays for CS Informatica Timişoara and the Romanian national futsal team.

References

External links
UEFA profile

1982 births
Living people
Romanian men's futsal players